Malwala Palace was built in 1845 and is located in Hyderabad, telangana, India. Malwala Palace was located along the road leading towards east from Charminar. It was constructed in Mughal and Rajasthani style and in Hyderabadi courtyard style, was known for its richly carved. wooden pavilion. Other than Raja Bhagwandas Bagh Pavilion, Malwala Palace was the only other palace in Hyderabad having a wooden pavilion. 
Barring the grand gateway, the entire palace complex has been demolished in August 2000 and a shopping mall has been built in its place.

History
The Malwalas were responsible for the revenue records of the Nizam's dominions.
The palace belonged to a noble family of Dewan Chandulal, the Malwala or the custodians of the Revenue Records (Daftar -i- Mal) of the erstwhile Hyderabad State. Built in the early 18th century by the noble Sagar Mall during the reign of first nizam in 1724, this was one of the very few palaces of Hyderabad built in the Mughal and Rajasthani styles of architecture. It acquired the name Malwala as Sagar Mall was the custodian of revenue records (maal) in hyderabad state. At the time department of revenue was held by the Mathur Kayastha family or Malwala family. During the 1940s, at the time of one of the family descendants, Raja Dharam Karan, the grandeur of the palace was resplendent and was noted for its glory and power.

It was an exquisite Diwan Khana made of huge arches in lacquered wood and painted with vegetable dyes and two galleries about 80 m in length flanking the Diwan Khana on each side constructed with Rangoon teak rafters. The galleries housed priceless collection of antique Indian art and artifacts. The palace also had a library, which boasted of a collection of rare books and manuscripts from the 10th century A.D.
It is one of the few wooden edifices in the city, a double-storeyed mansion with inner courtyards, with its ornamental archway entrance rich in stucco work and a fountain at the centre. There were wooden pavilions on two sides and overhanging wooden balconies with intricate patterns in Rajasthani and Mughal architectural styles. The palace had two wings, the eastern part used for official business, celebrations and social functions and the western one for residential purpose. The eastern part extended to 2460 square metres with a beautiful cistern standing in the middle of the vast courtyard. It consisted of a series of galleries in two floors and a wooden pavilion, which like the Diwan-i-Khas of the Delhi Fort is "an oriental magnificence in wood." Vegetable dyes were used for decorating the lacquered wood and the walls.
Tragedy struck the Malwala Palace, a protected heritage building, having rare wooden pavilion considered the "bride" among the garland of palaces around Charminar when the major portion as important as the "heart" was reduced to rubble in 2000. The demolition occurred after disputes between a sections of the owners of the palace, some in collusion with real estate developers and politicians over maintaining heritage status of the building.

References

External links
 Image of Malwala Palace Entrance
 Image of Malwala Palace Courtyard
 Palaces of Other Nobles in Hyderabad

Heritage structures in Hyderabad, India
Hyderabad State
Royal residences in India
Buildings and structures demolished in 2000
Demolished buildings and structures in India